Adarsh Nagar Assembly constituency may refer to 

 Adarsh Nagar, Delhi Assembly constituency
 Adarsh Nagar, Rajasthan Assembly constituency